Andrew Soi (born 1938) is a Kenyan long-distance runner. He competed in the marathon at the 1964 Summer Olympics.

References

1938 births
Living people
Athletes (track and field) at the 1964 Summer Olympics
Kenyan male long-distance runners
Kenyan male marathon runners
Olympic athletes of Kenya
Place of birth missing (living people)